The Irvington Tennis Club, located in northeast Portland, Oregon, is listed on the National Register of Historic Places. It was established in 1898 in the historic Irvington neighborhood. The mission of the club is "To share among our members a love of tennis that is distinguished by friendliness, inclusiveness and tradition.

See also
 National Register of Historic Places listings in Northeast Portland, Oregon

References

External links
 

1911 establishments in Oregon
Buildings and structures completed in 1911
Bungalow architecture in Oregon
Historic district contributing properties in Oregon
Irvington, Portland, Oregon
National Register of Historic Places in Portland, Oregon
Portland Historic Landmarks
Tennis clubs